Piano Songs is a studio album by pianists Bruce Brubaker and Ursula Oppens performing music composed by Meredith Monk, released on March 24, 2014 by ECM New Series.

Track listing

Personnel 
Adapted from the Piano Songs liner notes.

Musicians
 Bruce Brubaker – piano (1-5, 7, 8, 10-12), musical arrangements (4, 5, 8, 11)
 Ursula Oppens – piano (1-6, 8, 9, 11, 12)

Production and additional personnel
 Jody Elff – recording, editing
 Sascha Kleis – design
 Meredith Monk – production
 Jeremy Sarna – assistant engineer
 Allison Sniffin – production
 Christoph Stickel – mastering

Release history

References

External links 
 

2014 albums
ECM New Series albums
Meredith Monk albums
Bruce Brubaker albums
Ursula Oppens albums